Dominik Ritter (born 23 June 1989) is a Swiss footballer who is currently a free agent.

Career
Ritter started in the Basel youth system. He made his way through the ranks at Basel and played in their U-21 team. In 2008, he was loaned to FC Concordia Basel for a year. In 2009, Ritter was brought up the FC Basel first team squad.  He got his first chance to start in the game against FC Santa Coloma in the Europa League.

Because he was unable to get a place in the Basel first team, he played six games in the U-21 team, the club loaned him to FC Winterthur for the second half of the 2009–10 season. This loan was prolonged for the 2010–11 season and on 15 June 2011 the transfer became definite.

Newcastle Jets
On 2 July 2012, it was announced he was signed by A-League club Newcastle Jets FC on a one-year deal.

Ritter, along with teammates Marko Jesic and Bernardo Ribeiro were released by the Newcastle Jets at the end of the 2012–13 A-League season.

Titles and honours
Basel
 Swiss Champion at U-18 level: 2005/06
 Swiss Cup Winner at U-19/U-18 level: 2005/06

References

External links
 

1989 births
Living people
Swiss men's footballers
FC Basel players
FC Winterthur players
Swiss Super League players
Expatriate soccer players in Australia
Newcastle Jets FC players
A-League Men players
Association football defenders